Börje Vestlund (2 February 1960 – 22 September 2017) was a Swedish social democratic politician, member of the Riksdag from 2002 until his death in 2017. He was openly gay.

References

1960 births
2017 deaths
Members of the Riksdag from the Social Democrats
Gay politicians
Swedish LGBT politicians
Members of the Riksdag 2002–2006
LGBT legislators
Members of the Riksdag 2006–2010
Members of the Riksdag 2010–2014
21st-century Swedish LGBT people